Pedro Solé Junoy (7 May 1905 – 25 February 1982) was a Spanish football midfielder and manager.

External links

Espanyol archives 

1905 births
1982 deaths
Footballers from Barcelona
Spanish footballers
Association football midfielders
La Liga players
Segunda División players
UE Sant Andreu footballers
RCD Espanyol footballers
Real Murcia players
CD Alcoyano footballers
Spain international footballers
1934 FIFA World Cup players
Catalonia international footballers
Spanish football managers
La Liga managers
Segunda División managers
RCD Espanyol managers
CE Sabadell FC managers
Real Betis managers
UD Melilla managers
CD Atlético Baleares managers